Guntupalli is a Buddhist shrine in West Godavari district, South India at a distance of 85 km. from Vijayawada and 44 km from Eluru. With a rock cut cave set in a hill, there is a circular Chaityagraha with several images of Buddha, motive stupas and viharas. Coimbatore Gundupillar families are believed to have originated from this place.

History
This article traces the migration of Gundupillar families from Andhra (possibly Guntupalli onwards) to Coimbatore. The traceable history is derived from local documents and historical notes. The areas where they lived en route to Coimbatore may provide additional information to set the facts right.

Buildings and structures in West Godavari district
Buddhist temples in India
Buddhist sites in Andhra Pradesh